Patrick of Salisbury, 1st Earl of Salisbury ( 11221168) was an Anglo-Norman nobleman, and the uncle of the famous William Marshal.

His parents were Walter of Salisbury and Sibyl de Chaworth. Before 1141, Patrick was constable of Salisbury, a powerful local official but not a nobleman.  That year, Patrick married his sister, Sibyl, to John fitzGilbert the Marshal, who had been a local rival of his, and transferred his allegiance from King Stephen to the Empress Matilda. This political move gained him his earldom, and the friendship of John the Marshal. Patrick's nephew, William the Marshal would go on to become regent of England during the minority of Henry III. For a time William served as a household knight with Patrick during Patrick's time as governor of Poitou.

The Earl of Salisbury also minted his own coins, struck in the county town of Salisbury during the so-called "baronial issues" of 1135–1153. Only four examples have survived, three of which are in the Conte collection.

Patrick married twice, his second wife being Ela, daughter of William III Talvas, Duke of Alençon and Ponthieu, whom he married in 1149. Ela was widow of William de Warenne, 3rd Earl of Surrey. Patrick and Ela had a son, William in about 1150 and three others, including Walter and Philip.

He was killed at Poitiers, France on 27 March 1168 in an ambush by forces of Guy of Lusignan.

References

Barlow, Frank. The Feudal Kingdom of England 1042–1216 Londan: Longman Group Limited, 1961. 

Salisbury, Patrick, 1st Earl of
Salisbury, Patrick, 1st Earl of
Salisbury, Patrick, 1st Earl of
Salisbury, Patrick, 1st Earl of
Earls of Salisbury (1149 creation)
High Sheriffs of Wiltshire
Salisbury, Patrick, 1st Earl of
Salisbury, Patrick, 1st Earl of
Year of birth uncertain
People of The Anarchy
Peers created by Empress Matilda